This is a list of places of worship in London, 1804.

It is based on a list in A View of London, or, The Stranger's Guide through the British Metropolis (1804), headed "An Impartial List of the Principal Churches, Chapels, and Meeting-Houses". The choice lay in fact among Protestant places of worship. Some of the information was not quite current, ministers having died.

The Guide excluded Quaker meeting-houses. "Stranger churches", Roman Catholic chapels, and synagogues were listed in The Picture of London (1807).

Terminology at the time was variable: "meeting-house" and "chapel" were interchangeable, as were "Independent" and "congregational". Dissenters were usually classed under the "Three Denominations" (Presbyterian, Independent and Baptist). Methodists were sharply divided into the Calvinistic Methodists, who typically followed George Whitefield or preachers of the Countess of Huntingdon's Connexion, and the Wesleyans. Unitarian congregations were only just being distinguished as anti-Trinitarians, from Arians. The New Jerusalem Church (Swedenborgians) was not included in the selections by the View.

A

B

C

D

E

F

G

H

I

J

K

L

M

N

O

P

Q

R

S

T

U

W

See also
 List of places of worship in London, 1738

Notes

External links

1804 in Christianity
Lists of religious buildings and structures in London
History of Christianity in England
1804 in London